Georgia–Netherlands relations are the bilateral and diplomatic relations between Georgia and the Netherlands. Georgia has an embassy in The Hague, which opened in 2007. The Netherlands has an embassy in Tbilisi since 2001. The countries established diplomatic relations on 22 April 1992. Both countries are full members of the Council of Europe.

Political relations 
On January 21, 2020, Dutch Minister of Foreign Affairs Stef Blok visited Georgia, held bilateral meetings with the Georgian Foreign Minister, David Zalkaliani, visited the European Union Monitoring Mission office and visited the occupation line at Odzi.

Embassies 
The Embassy of Georgia is located in The Hague, the Netherlands. The Embassy of the Netherlands is located in Tbilisi, Georgia.

See also
 Embassy of Georgia, The Hague
 Foreign relations of Georgia
 Foreign relations of the Netherlands

References 

 
Netherlands
Bilateral relations of the Netherlands